Reason Why? is Angelic Upstarts's fifth album, released in 1983. Trouser Press called it "the Upstarts’ great leap forward, a blend of angry socio-political lyrics with a controlled and melodic rock attack. A surprisingly good record for all rock tastes."

"Woman in Disguise" and "Solidarity" were released as singles, the former an attack on Margaret Thatcher, and the latter a tribute to the Polish trade union.

Track listing
All lyrics written by Thomas Mensforth. All music composed by Ray Cowie; except where noted.

Side A		
 "Woman in Disguise"
 "Never Give Up" (Mensforth, Cowie, Paul Thompson)
 "Waiting, Hating"
 "Reason Why" (Mensforth, Cowie, Paul Thompson)
 "Nobody Was Saved"
 "Geordies Wife" (Mensforth) 
 "Loneliness of the Long Distance Runner"

Side B		
 "42nd Street" (Mensforth, Tony Morrison)
 "The Burglar" (Mensforth, Brian Hayes)
 "Solidarity" 
 "As The Passion" (Mensforth, Brian Hayes)
 "A Young Punk" (Mensforth, Brian Hayes)
 "Where We Started"

Personnel
Angelic Upstarts
Mensi - vocals
Mond - guitar, vocals
Brian Hayes - guitar
Tony "Feedback" Morrison - bass
with:
Paul Thompson - guest drummer
Peter Lambert - drums on "The Burglar" and "Where We Started"
Robbie Garrette - keyboards
Simon Lloyd - saxophone
Kenny Mountain, Terry Sharpe, Terry Wilson-Slesser - backing vocals
Technical
Iain O'Higgins - engineer
Jim Phelan - artwork

References

1983 albums
Angelic Upstarts albums